Josh Logan may refer to:
Joshua Logan (1908–1988), American director, writer, and actor
Josh Logan (country singer), American singer
Josh Logan (rock singer) (born 1980), American singer-songwriter